Bishop Heber College is a religious minority educational institution in Tiruchirappalli, Tamil Nadu, India. It was founded in 1966, although the school has historical roots extending through various earlier local religious schools to about the mid-nineteenth century. Bishop Heber College offers several undergraduate and graduate degrees including the doctorate level.

Rankings

Bishop Heber College was ranked 43 among colleges in India by National Institutional Ranking Framework (NIRF) in 2022.

References

External links
Bishop Heber College

Christian universities and colleges in India
Universities and colleges in Tiruchirappalli
Educational institutions established in 1966
1966 establishments in Madras State
Colleges affiliated to Bharathidasan University